Pertenhall is a small village and civil parish located in Bedfordshire, close to the borders of Cambridgeshire and Northamptonshire. Its parish council is a Quality Parish Council. It has recently published its Parish Plan which is available on the website

The name derives from Peters Hill (allegedly) based on the Hill by St Peters Church. The parish of Pertenhall & Swineshead is part of the Stodden Hundred (which comprises Bolnhurst, Clapham, Dean and Shelton, Keysoe, Knotting, Little Staughton, Melchbourne, Milton Ernest, Oakley, Pertenhall, Riseley, Shelton, Tilbrook and Yelden).

The village is drawn out along the B660 beginning with Chapel Yard, derived from the Moravian Chapel located there and is characterised by a series of 'Ends', namely Wood End (a cul-de-sac, terminating at a footpath known locally as 'the Track', Chadwell End (a thoroughfare), derived from the Chad Well that exists nearby and leading to Green End at the south.

Moravian Chapel 

Little remains of the chapel itself but there are still gravestones in the graveyard.

St Peter's Church 

The village's oldest building is the church, which dates from Norman times.  There are also a number of interesting buildings such as the Manor House, Hoo Farm and Green End Farm House, all of which date back several hundred years.

Village Hall 

The Village Hall was formerly the Village School which was in use from 1870 to 1946.  The school was built on a site bequeathed by the Reverend John King Martyn M.A. and a plaque in the hall commemorates this. John King Martyn was the grandson of the botanist John Martyn.

Education 
The primary school within catchment of Pertenhall is located in the village of Riseley, four miles away from Pertenhall, and is called Riseley Primary School. The secondary school within catchment of Pertenhall is in the village of Sharnbrook, eight miles away from Pertenhall, and is called Sharnbrook Academy.

References

External links

Pertenhall & Swineshead Parish Council

Stodden Hundred

Villages in Bedfordshire
Civil parishes in Bedfordshire
Borough of Bedford